Nyx ("Night") is the Greek goddess and personification of night. A shadowy figure, Nyx stood at or near the beginning of creation and mothered other personified deities, such as Hypnos (Sleep) and Thanatos (Death), with Erebus (Darkness). She is the first child of Chaos. She is typically portrayed as either a winged goddess with a dark cloud halo or dressed in black surrounded by dark mist. Her Roman equivalent is Nox.

Mythology and literature

Hesiod
In Hesiod's Theogony, Nyx is born of Chaos. With Erebus (Darkness), Nyx gives birth to Aether (Brightness) and Hemera (Day). Later, on her own, Nyx gives birth to Moros (Doom, Destiny), the Keres (Destruction, Death), Thanatos (Death), Hypnos (Sleep), the Oneiroi (Dreams), Momus (Blame), Oizys (Pain, Distress), the Hesperides, the Moirai (Fates), Nemesis (Indignation, Retribution), Apate (Deceit), Philotes (Friendship), Geras (Old Age), and Eris (Strife).

In his description of Tartarus, Hesiod locates there the home of Nyx, and the homes of her children Hypnos and Thanatos. Hesiod says further that Nyx's daughter Hemera (Day) left Tartarus just as Nyx (Night) entered it; continuing cyclicly, when Hemera returned, Nyx left.

Homer
At Iliad 14.249–61, Hypnos, the minor deity of sleep, reminds Hera of an old favor after she asks him to put Zeus to sleep. He had once before put Zeus to sleep at the bidding of Hera, allowing her to cause Heracles (who was returning by sea from Laomedon's Troy) great misfortune. Zeus was furious and would have smote Hypnos into the sea if he had not fled to Nyx, his mother, in fear. Homer goes on to say that Zeus, fearing Nyx's anger, held his fury at bay and in this way Hypnos escaped the wrath of Zeus by appealing to his powerful mother. He disturbed Zeus only a few times after that, always fearing Zeus and running back to his mother, Nyx, who would have confronted Zeus with maternal fury. This tale is often cited as evidence that Zeus is fearful of Nyx.

Others 
In several fragmentary poems attributed to Orpheus Nyx, rather than Chaos, is the first principle from which all creation emerges. Nyx occupies a cave or adyton, in which she gives oracles. Cronus – who is chained within, asleep and drunk on honey – dreams and prophesies. Outside the cave, Adrasteia clashes cymbals and beats upon her tympanon, moving the entire universe in an ecstatic dance to the rhythm of Nyx's chanting. Phanes – the strange, monstrous, hermaphrodite Orphic demiurge – was the child or father of Nyx. Nyx is also the first principle in the opening chorus of Aristophanes' The Birds, which may be Orphic in inspiration. Here she is also the mother of Eros.

The theme of Nyx's cave or mansion, beyond the ocean (as in Hesiod) or somewhere at the edge of the cosmos (as in later Orphism) may be echoed in the philosophical poem of Parmenides. The classical scholar Walter Burkert has speculated that the house of the goddess to which the philosopher is transported is the palace of Nyx.

In Virgil's Aeneid, Nox (Night) is said to be the mother of the Furies by Hades.

In some accounts, the goddess of witchcraft, Hecate, was also called the daughter of Night.

Some authors made Nyx the mother of Eos, the dawn goddess, who was often conflated with Nyx's daughter Hemera. When Eos' son Memnon was killed during the Trojan War, Eos made Helios (the sun god) downcast, and asked Nyx to come out earlier so that she would collect her son's dead body undetected by the Greek and the Trojan armies.

Cult
There was no known temple dedicated to Nyx, but statues are known to have been made of her and a few cult practices of her are mentioned. According to Pausanias, she had an oracle on the acropolis at Megara. Pausanias wrote:

More often, Nyx was worshipped in the background of other cults.  Thus there was a statue called "Night" in the Temple of Artemis at Ephesus. The Spartans had a cult of Sleep and Death, conceived of as twins. Cult titles composed of compounds of nyx- are attested for several deities, most notably Dionysus Nyktelios "nocturnal" and Aphrodite Philopannyx "who loves the whole night".

Roman authors mentioned cult practices and wrote hymns in the honor of their equivalent goddess Nox (Night). Ovid wrote: "May 9 Lemuria Nefastus. You ancient rite will be performed, Nox Lemuria; here will be offerings to the mute dead", and she is also mentioned by Statius:

Worship 
Nyx was worshiped by the early Orphic people. Their hymns portray her as the parent of all life. Her offerings consist of black animals that were burned and buried.

Nyx is also worshiped today by practicing Pagans and Wiccans. Their offerings to the goddess include items like night-blooming flowers, moonstone, agate, and other things relating to the moon and night itself. Work with Nyx is done at night and typically includes shadow work and divination.

Astronomy
In 1997, the International Astronomical Union approved the name Nyx for a mons (mountain/peak) feature on the planet Venus. Nyx Mons is located at latitude 30° North and longitude 48.5° East on the Venusian surface. Its diameter is 875 km.

On June 21, 2006, the International Astronomical Union renamed one of Pluto's recently discovered moons (S/2005 P 2) Nix, in honor of Nyx. The name was spelled with an "i" instead of a "y", to avoid conflict with the asteroid 3908 Nyx.

Notes

References 
 Aristophanes, Birds. The Complete Greek Drama. vol. 2. Eugene O'Neill, Jr. New York. Random House. 1938. Online version at the Perseus Digital Library.
 Athanassakis, Apostolos N., and Benjamin M. Wolkow, The Orphic Hymns, Johns Hopkins University Press, 2013) . Google Books.
 Gantz, Early Greek Myth: A Guide to Literary and Artistic Sources, Johns Hopkins University Press, 1996, Two volumes:  (Vol. 1),  (Vol. 2).
 Grimal, Pierre, The Dictionary of Classical Mythology, Wiley-Blackwell, 1996, .
 Hesiod, Theogony, in The Homeric Hymns and Homerica with an English Translation by Hugh G. Evelyn-White, Cambridge, Massachusetts, Harvard University Press; London, William Heinemann Ltd. 1914. Online version at the Perseus Digital Library.
 Ovid, Fasti, A. J. Boyle, R. D. Woodard (translators); Penguin Classics, 2000. .
 Pausanias, Description of Greece with an English Translation by W.H.S. Jones, Litt.D., and H.A. Ormerod, M.A., in 4 Volumes. Cambridge, MA, Harvard University Press; London, William Heinemann Ltd. 1918. Online version at the Perseus Digital Library
 Quintus Smyrnaeus, Quintus Smyrnaeus: The Fall of Troy, translated by A.S. Way, Cambridge, Massachusetts, Harvard University Press, 1913. Internet Archive.
 Smith, William (ed.), Dictionary of Greek and Roman Biography and Mythology, London, 1873.
 Virgil, Aeneid, Theodore C. Williams. trans. Boston. Houghton Mifflin Co. 1910. Online version at the Perseus Digital Library.

External links 
 
 NYX from The Theoi Project
 NYX in Mythopedia

 
Personifications in Greek mythology
Greek primordial deities
Night goddesses
Oracular goddesses
Underworld goddesses
Greek goddesses
Women of Hades
Deities in the Iliad
Classical oracles
Greek underworld